Clostridium akagii  is a nitrogen-fixing and anaerobic bacterium from the genus Clostridium which has been isolated from the Fichtel Mountains in Germany.

References

 

Bacteria described in 2000
akagii